The Bahia spinetail (Synallaxis cinerea) is a species of bird in the family Furnariidae. It is endemic to Brazil.

Its natural habitat is subtropical or tropical moist montane forests. It is threatened by habitat loss.

References

External links
BirdLife Species Factsheet.

Synallaxis
Birds of the Atlantic Forest
Endemic birds of Brazil
Birds described in 1831
Taxa named by Prince Maximilian of Wied-Neuwied
Taxonomy articles created by Polbot